The People may refer to:

Legal jargon
 The People, term used to refer to The People in general, in legal documents
 "We the People of the United States" from the Preamble to the United States Constitution
 In philosophy, economics, and political science, the term "the people" may be invoked when discussing about the Common good

Music
 People!, a rock band active mainly in the 1960s.
 The People vs., the first album by rapper Trick-Trick.
 The People, an EP by The Music
 "The People" (Common song), a single from rapper Common's 2007 album Finding Forever

Popular culture
 The People Versus a television game show which aired on ITV from 2000 to 2002 in the United Kingdom
 The People, series of fantasy novelettes and short stories by Zenna Henderson, collected in Ingathering: The Complete People Stories
 The People (film), a 1972 television film starring William Shatner, based on the "Pottage" story by Zenna Henderson
 The People, an unfinished novel by Bernard Malamud.
 The People, a collective name of all subterranean fairy cultures in the Artemis Fowl book series

Publications
 The People newspaper, formerly known as the Sunday People, a British "red-top" Sunday-only newspaper, owned by the Trinity Mirror Group
 The People (1891), official English-language organ of the Socialist Labor Party of America from 1891 to 2008
 The People, a daily newspaper in Kenya
 The People, or an-Nas, a sura (chapter) of the Qur'an
 The People's Daily, the biggest newspaper group in China

See also
 People (disambiguation)
 The Crown is the state in all its aspects within the jurisprudence of the Commonwealth realms. In the United States the form "the People" is often used instead.